Marble Church may refer to:

 Frederik's Church, Copenhagen, Denmark
 Marble Church, Bodelwyddan, Wales

See also
 Marble Collegiate Church, New York
 Marble Community Church, Colorado